Dazhou is a prefecture-level city in the northeast corner of Sichuan province, China, bordering Shaanxi to the north and Chongqing to the east and south. As of 2020 census, Dazhou was home to 5,385,422 inhabitants whom 1,850,869 lived in the built-up (or metro) area made of 2 urban districts.

History

Dazhou's history goes back to the Eastern Han Dynasty when in 90 AD it was made a county by the name of Liweizhou ). Then until the Liao Dynasty its name was Zaidi. During the Liao and Tang dynasties its name was again changed, this time to Tongzhou. Finally in the Song Dynasty it was given its present name of Dazhou.

Notable people from Dazhou include the Three Kingdoms writer Chen Shou, Song Dynasty astronomer Zhang Sixun, and Ming and Qing Dynasty philosopher and educator Tang Zhen. Dazhou also made notable contributions to the Communist Revolution. Red Army heroes such as Xu Xiangqian, Li Xiannian, Xu Shiyou, Wang Weizhou, and Zhang Aiping were all from or lived in Dazhou.

The partially preserved mausoleum complex (in particular, its gate towers, known as que of the Shen family in Qu County,
dating from the Han Dynasty, is a well-known  architectural monument.

Geography and climate
Dazhou is the easternmost prefecture-level division of the province, bordering Ankang and Hanzhong (both in Shaanxi) to the north, Chengkou County, Kai County, and Wanzhou District of Chongqing to the east, the Chongqing counties of Liangping and Dianjiang to the south, Guang'an to the southwest, Nanchong to the west, and Bazhong to the northwest. It is centrally located between Chongqing and Xi'an.

The terrain is largely mountainous (Daba Mountains and adjacent ranges).

Typical of the Sichuan Basin, Dazhou has a monsoon-influenced humid subtropical climate (Köppen Cwa) and is largely mild and humid, with four distinct seasons. Winter is short, mild, and foggy, though actual precipitation is low. January averages  and, while frost may occur, snow is rare. Summers are long, hot and humid, with highs often exceeding . Rainfall is light in winter and can be heavy in summer, and over 70% of the annual total occurs from May to September. The annual frost-free period lasts around 300 days.

Administration
It is one of Sichuan's most populous cities with 5,468,097 residents as of 2010 census.

Economy
Dazhou is an important river and land transportation hub for the region. Numerous national highways, expressways, and rail lines pass through Dazhou connecting it directly with major cities in China such as Chengdu, Xi'an, Wuhan, Guangzhou, Shenzhen, Beijing, etc., making it one of Sichuan's important trade centers.

Dazhou has numerous natural resources including large natural gas fields and an abundance of mineral resources such as salt, coal, manganese, lithium, and limestone. Major agricultural products include pork, beef, and tea. Other industries are chemical production, coal power, metallurgy, textiles, building materials, and processed food.

Tourism
Dazhou is blessed with both cultural and natural attractions. There are several national and provincial cultural sites and many national and provincial protected forests and nature reserves. Xuanhan's Baili Gorges have scenery and rapids, leading to the nickname "Little Three Gorges". Mountains are this area's greatest attraction.

Points of interest 
In Dazhou, there is a residential building with 16 floors with a 20 metres tall electricity pylon on the roof .

Transportation 
China National Highway 210
Xiangyu Railway (Xiangyang, Hubei−Chongqing)
Dazhou–Chengdu railway
A branch line from Dacheng to Wanzhou, Chongqing where it connects with the Yiwan Railway
 Dazhou Jinya Airport, a new airport opened in May 2022

References

External links
 Official Website 

 
Cities in Sichuan
Prefecture-level divisions of Sichuan